Ernst Haefliger (6 July 191917 March 2007) was a Swiss tenor.

Biography 
Haefliger was born in Davos, Switzerland, on 6 July 1919 and studied at the Wettinger Seminary and the Zürich Conservatory. Later he became a pupil of Fernando Carpi in Geneva and the noted tenor Julius Patzak in Vienna. He devoted himself to lieder and choral works, and soon established a reputation for impeccable style and musicianship.

Haefliger sang the Evangelist in Bach's St John Passion for the first time in Zurich, in 1943. After this debut he was engaged for several concerts in Switzerland and – after World War II – abroad. He soon won the attention of Ferenc Fricsay, who engaged him for the Salzburg Festival where Haefliger's world career started in 1949 with the role of Tiresias in Carl Orff's opera Antigonae.  He also sang the role of First Armed Man in Die Zauberflöte conducted by Wilhelm Furtwängler the same year at the Salzburg Festival.

In 1952, he responded to the call of Ferenc Fricsay and joined him at the Deutsche Oper Berlin where he sang the tenor parts in all Mozart operas, in Rossini's The Barber of Seville and Le comte Ory, in Pfitzner's Palestrina, the role of Hans in Smetana's The Bartered Bride, among others.

Haefliger had a lengthy and extensive international career. He made his Boston debut in 1965 for the Peabody Mason Concert series. Furthermore, he recorded many lieder, oratorio's and operas for Angel, Columbia, Vanguard and Philips Records, whereas Deutsche Grammophon has issued a box set of twelve CD’s entitled "The Art of Ernst Haefliger," with repertoire ranging from J.S. Bach to Janácek and including the three great Schubert lieder cycles. 

From 1971 to 1988, he taught at the Hochschule für Musik in Munich, Germany.  

Haefliger also gave master classes in Zürich, Japan and the United States, and wrote "Die Singstimme" (Berne 1983).

Personal life 
Haefliger died from acute decompensated heart failure on 17 March 2007, in Davos, aged 88. The pianist, Andreas Haefliger, is his son.

Awards 
 Berliner Kammersänger

References

External links 
Biography from Bach-Cantatas.com
Ernst Haefliger erinnert sich an Karl Richter (Interview)
Ode to Joy, video (YouTube)
Singing Mozart (YouTube, audio only)
Interview with Ernst Haefliger, 3 August 1992

1919 births
2007 deaths
People from Davos
Academic staff of the University of Music and Performing Arts Munich
20th-century Swiss male opera singers
Swiss operatic tenors
Swiss music educators
Officers Crosses of the Order of Merit of the Federal Republic of Germany